Van der Zee is a Dutch toponymic surname meaning "from the sea". It is relatively common in the province of Friesland. Notable people with the surname include:

Age van der Zee (1903–1982), Dutch pole vaulter
Anouska van der Zee (born 1976), Dutch cyclist
Bibi van der Zee (born 1970s), British journalist
Hans van der Zee (born 1956), Dutch football manager
Hein van der Zee (1929–1991), Dutch boxer
 (born 1967), Dutch checkers/draughts player
James Van Der Zee (1886–1983), American photographer
Jim van der Zee (born 1995), Dutch singer
Karen Van der Zee (born 1947), pseudonym of Dutch romance novelist Windela Kilmer

See also
C. Van Der Zee House, historic home in Albany, New York

References

Dutch-language surnames
Dutch toponymic surnames